Relations between India and Guyana ever since the independence of Guyana in May 1966 have been cordial. The cordiality in the relation remains unaffected with changes in governments either in India or in Guyana. Late Shrimati Indira Gandhi, the then Prime Minister of India, visited Guyana in 1968, late Dr. Shankar Dayal Sharma, the then Vice President of India visited Guyana in 1988 and Shri Bhairon Singh Shekhawat, the then Vice President of India came on a state visit to Guyana in 2006.

Both countries were once part of the British Empire. There are approximately 327,000 Guyanese citizens who are of Indian descent. Indo-Guyanese make up the largest ethnic group in Guyana.

Economic Co-operation
The cooperation between the two countries in sharing developmental experience is mainly routed through Indian Technical & Economic Cooperation (ITEC) under which forty scholarships are granted every year in various courses. Besides, some experts are also deputed to Guyana from time to time on request in specified areas of activity.

Cultural Connections
Indian Cultural Centre in Georgetown was established in 1972 with the objective of strengthening cultural relations and mutual understanding between India and Guyana and their peoples. The Centre runs regular classes in Yoga and Dance (Kathak). The Centre has a well equipped Auditorium where cultural events are organised on a regular basis. The teachers and students of ICC participate in events by the local community on various occasions round the year. The Centre has a library with books/publications on history, literature, art, culture, mythology and works of eminent scholars and authors.

An important cultural connection between India and Guyana is cricket. With the advent of the Indian Premier League, many Guyanese players were contracted to play in India.

Notable high commissioners 

Guyana to India

 Ronald Gajraj, 2005-2015

See also 

 List of Ambassadors and High Commissioners of India
 List of Indo-Guyanese People

References

 
India
Bilateral relations of India
India
Guyana